Whites Landing is an unincorporated community and census-designated place in Erie and Sandusky counties, Ohio, United States. As of the 2010 census it had a population of 375. It is located within Margaretta and Townsend townships.

Geography
Whites Landing is located on the border between Erie and Sandusky counties, on the south shore of Sandusky Bay, an arm of Lake Erie.

Demographics

References

Geography of Erie County, Ohio
Census-designated places in Ohio
Ohio populated places on Lake Erie
Census-designated places in Erie County, Ohio